Jaideep Malhotra is an India-based gynecologist, infertility specialist and an ace sonologist. She is the founder of the Infertility Centre of Rainbow IVF and also serves as the director of the hospital. Malhotra received award from Prime minister of Nepal for first 100 IVF babies of Nepal and her clinic, Rainbow IVF was first in Uttar Pradesh for successful IVF, ICSI, TESA, twins and triplets.

Malhotra is current president of the Indian Society for Assisted Reproduction, Indian Society of Prenatal Diagnosis and Therapy, South Asian Federation of Menopause societies and was the former president of Federation of Obstetrics & Gynaecological Societies of India. She is the first woman to be a member of FIGO Committee of Reproductive Medicine.

Early life and education
Malhotra was born on 11 September 1960 in Meerut, in the Indian state of Uttar Pradesh.  She studied medicine (MBBS) at AMU Institute Of Ophthalmology, Aligarh in 1983 and later, she completed her post doctoral studies in Obstetrics and Gynecology from the same college. She is the fellow of the Indian College of Obstetricians & Gynaecologists, Fellow Indian College of Maternal & Child Health, Fellow Indian Academy of Juvenile & Adolescent Gynaecology and Obstetrics and Fellow Indian College of Medical Ultrasound. She is a member of Medical Council of India, Indian Medical Association, Vice President Indian Menopause Society & South Asia Menopause Society, Federation of Obstetric and Gynaecological Societies of India and Asia Pacific Initiative for Reproductive Endocrinology. She has completed training in ultrasound procedures from Singapore and endoscopy from Germany. She also has been the best National Medical Sports woman during her medical career.

References

1960 births
Living people
Indian gynaecologists
People from Meerut